Sólveig Anspach (8 December 1960 – 7 August 2015) was an Icelandic-French film director and screenwriter. Born to a German-Romanian father Gerhard Anspach and an Icelandic mother Högna Sigurðardóttir, she spent most of her life living and working in France. After studying philosophy and clinical psychology in Paris, she enrolled in La Fémis and graduated with a diploma in directing in 1989. Her film Stormy Weather was screened in the Un Certain Regard section at the 2003 Cannes Film Festival. Anspach died of breast cancer on 7 August 2015 at the age of 54.

Filmography

References

External links

1960 births
2015 deaths
Solveig Anspach
Solveig Anspach
Solveig Anspach
Solveig Anspach
French film directors
French women film directors
French women screenwriters
French screenwriters
French documentary filmmakers
French people of German descent
French people of Romanian descent
Icelandic people of Romanian descent
Icelandic people of German descent
Solveig Anspach
Deaths from breast cancer
Deaths from cancer in France
Women documentary filmmakers